Belle Chevre is an artisanal goat cheese maker in rural Alabama. It was established in 1986 and is located in Limestone County, Alabama near Elkmont.

Company history
Belle Chevre was founded by Leone Jones Asbury, who later partnered with, then sold her share of the endeavor to, Liz Parnell. Current president, Tasia Malakasis, acquired the company from Liz Parnell in 2007. Belle Chevre opened their first cheese shop & tasting room in downtown Elkmont, AL in April 2013.

Product line
Belle Chevre's product line includes classic goat cheese and goat cheese spreads in five flavors (original, honey, garden veggie, roasted red pepper, fig, and pumpkin spice).They also offer a slightly aged chevre that is hand-wrapped between two brined grape leaves called "the greek kiss".

Recognition and awards

Belle Chevre has produced six different cheese types that have been honored by the American Cheese Society. The cheese was selected by a James Beard Award winning chef as a runner up for Garden & Gun magazine's 2011 Made in the South award. They were voted a Taste Test Award Winner by Cooking Light magazine in 2010, which declares the cheese "has earned the kind of cult status that puts small artisans on the map." Steven Jenkins, one of the world's foremost authorities on cheeses of the world, said “Alabama's FBC cheeses and fromage blanc taste as fine as the best of the Loire Valley, Perigord and Provence, and that's a mouthful."

See also
 List of cheesemakers

References

Companies based in Alabama
Limestone County, Alabama
Cheesemakers
1986 establishments in Alabama
Dairy products companies of the United States